The following lists events that happened during 1869 in Australia.

Incumbents

Governors
Governors of the Australian colonies:
Governor of New South Wales – Somerset Lowry-Corry, 4th Earl Belmore
Governor of Victoria – Sir John Manners-Sutton
Governor of Queensland – Colonel Sir Samuel Blackall
Governor of Western Australia – Sir Benjamin Pine (appointed, but not sworn in), Sir Frederick Weld (from 18 September)
Governor of South Australia – Sir James Fergusson, 6th Baronet (from 16 February)
Governor of Tasmania – Charles Du Cane (from 15 January)
Governor of Western Australia – Sir Benjamin Pine, then The Hon. Sir Frederick Weld GCMG.

Premiers
Premiers of the Australian colonies:
Premier of New South Wales – John Robertson
Premier of Victoria – James McCulloch (until 20 September), then John Alexander MacPherson
Premier of Queensland – Charles Lilley
Premier of South Australia – Henry Strangways
Premier of Tasmania – Sir Richard Dry (until 1 August), then James Milne Wilson (from 4 August)

Events
9 January – The British clipper ship Thermopylae arrives in Melbourne, having sailed from London in the record time of 64 days.
5 February – A large gold nugget, named The Welcome Stranger, is found at Moliagul, Victoria.
5 February – George Goyder establishes a settlement of 135 people at Port Darwin.
2 March – After several days hiding in bushland near Bunbury, Western Australia, Irish political prisoner John Boyle O'Reilly escapes to America on the whaler Gazelle.
3 March – William Lanne, known as "King Billy", the last "full-blooded" Tasmanian Aboriginal man dies. His body is secretly dismembered and his skull removed while in the morgue, and Dr William Crowther, future Premier of Tasmania, is suspected as the culprit.
5 March – The New South Wales government declares that Saint Patrick's Day, St. Andrew's Day and St George's Day are no longer public holidays.
24 March – A fatal case of cholera is reported in Sydney.
8 May – The bushranger Captain Moonlite holds up a bank in Mount Egerton, Victoria.
22 June – Prince Alfred College opens in Adelaide, South Australia.
18 October – The Lithgow Zig Zag Railway was opened.

Science and technology
1 May – A submarine telegraph cable is completed, joining Tasmania to the mainland.

Sport
2 November – Warrior wins the Melbourne Cup.

Births

 20 January – F. Matthias Alexander, actor and author (d. 1955)
 25 February – Staniforth Smith, Western Australian politician (d. 1934)
 10 March – Sir John Longstaff, artist (d. 1941)
 23 March – William Robson, New South Wales politician and businessman (d. 1951)
 11 April – John Patrick McGlinn, public servant and soldier (d. 1946)
 13 April – Vida Goldstein, suffragette and social reformer (d. 1949)
 27 April – May Moss, welfare worker and suffragette (d. 1948)
 2 May – Florence Stawell, classical scholar (d. 1936)
 14 May – Percy Abbott, New South Wales politician, soldier and solicitor (d. 1940)
 15 May – John Storey, 20th Premier of New South Wales (d. 1921)
 18 May – Harold Grimwade, military officer, businessman and pharmacist (d. 1949)
 19 May – William Gibson, Victorian politician (d. 1955)
 23 May – Sir George Beeby, New South Wales politician, judge and author (d. 1942)
 11 July – Peter McAlister, cricketer (d. 1938)
 21 July – John McDonald, Western Australian politician (d. 1934)
 6 August – Marie Pitt, poet and journalist (d. 1948)
 7 August – E. J. Brady, journalist and poet (d. 1952)
 8 August – George James Coates, artist (d. 1930)
 28 August – Sir Albert Ellis, prospector (d. 1951)
 28 September – John Bisdee, military officer (d. 1930)
 30 September – Ernie Jones, Australian rules footballer and cricketer (d. 1943)
 24 October – Charlie McLeod, cricketer (d. 1918)
 2 December – Sir John Kirwan, Western Australian politician (born in the United Kingdom) (d. 1949)
 7 December – Frank Laver, cricketer and baseball player (d. 1919)
 13 December – John Shirlow, artist (d. 1936)
 21 December – Albert Green, Western Australian politician (d. 1940)
 29 December – Bill Howell, cricketer (d. 1940)

Deaths

 3 March – William Lanne, whaler (b. 1835)
 6 May – Henry Vincent, prison superintendent (born in the United Kingdom) (b. 1796)
 9 May – John Plunkett, New South Wales politician (born in Ireland) (b. 1802)
 16 June – Charles Sturt, explorer (born in the British Raj and died in the United Kingdom) (b. 1795)
 4 September – John Pascoe Fawkner, Victorian politician and businessman (born in the United Kingdom) (b. 1792)
 9 November – Charles Flaxman, settler and landowner (born in the United Kingdom) (b. 1806)

References

 
Australia
Years of the 19th century in Australia